Shehzad Azam (1 November 1985 – 30 September 2022) was a Pakistani cricketer who played for Islamabad. He was the leading wicket-taker for Islamabad in the 2017–18 Quaid-e-Azam Trophy, with 26 dismissals in seven matches. He was also the leading wicket-taker for Islamabad in the 2018–19 Quaid-e-Azam One Day Cup, with nine dismissals in eight matches.

References

External links
 

1985 births
2022 deaths
Pakistani cricketers
Islamabad cricketers
Cricketers from Sialkot